The Singleton field is the field of singletons which are the most fundamental unitary and irreducible representation of the Anti-de Sitter group SO(3,2). They were discovered by Paul Dirac.

See also
 Singleton (mathematics)

Conformal field theory